God Sista (stylized as GOD SISTA) is LISA's first concept album and fifth overall album. It was released nearly a year after her last album, Kaze no Ongaku 〜Radiating from an N.G.O.〜 (かぜのおんがく / Music of the Wind), though the latter album had been released by her previous record label Tokuma Japan Communications.  The album charted at No. 90 on the Oricon Albums Charts and remained on the charts for five weeks. The album has sold 7,653 copies.

Background information
God Sista is Japanese R&B artist LISA's first concept album. It peaked at No. 90 on the Oricon charts, but dropped in rank to take No. 98 for the week, only staying on the charts for five weeks. During its run, it sold 7,653 copies.

The album was split up into "acts," and consisted of remixes and standard tracks, including a remix of "Switch," which featured singer-songwriter Koda Kumi and the duo Heartsdales. The remix was composed by DJ Watarai, who had also worked with duo Soulhead for their song "Too Late" from their Re-Construct Album Vol.1 Reflection remix album. Another remix placed on the album was "Sweetest," which was originally by JHETT a.k.a. YAKKO for AQUARIUS and featured LISA. The track "It's On" was used as the album's main promotional track and was even given a music video on the limited CD+DVD editions of the album.

For the album, LISA recorded a new rendition of the song "Come Back To Me ~reviens moi~," which she had performed with VERBAL and Taku Takahashi during her time with m-flo in April 2000.

Track listing

References

External links
 LISA Official Discography Web Site
 Official Oricon
 HMV Album Release

2006 albums
LISA (Japanese musician, born 1974) albums
Avex Group albums